The Battle Dress Uniform (BDU) is a camouflaged combat uniform that was used by the United States Armed Forces as their standard combat uniform from the early 1980s to the mid-2000s. Since then, it has been replaced or supplanted in every branch of the U.S. Armed Forces.

BDU-style uniforms and derivatives still see widespread use in other countries (some of them being former U.S. surplus stocks transferred under U.S. security assistance programs), while others are still worn by some U.S. federal, state, and local law enforcement agents who may work in tactical situations, such as the DEA FAST and SWAT teams. The uniforms are also used by urban search and rescue groups such as FEMA USAR task force teams and firefighting agencies when conducting technical rescues or other special operations.

As late as 2014, BDUs were worn by officers of the U.S. Public Health Service as the prescribed uniform for deployment, but have since been replaced by a variant of the U.S. Coast Guard's Operational Dress Uniform.

Background

While the Italian Army was the first military organization to issue camouflage clothing, albeit in limited numbers, the Germans were noted for their efforts in this field before the Second World War. After much trial, the Oberkommando der Wehrmacht (abbrev. OKW) authorized Heeres-Splittermuster 31, more commonly known as "splinter pattern", for use in shelter-quarters (Zeltbahnen) in the 1930s. In 1940, SS-Verfügungstruppe (abbrev. SS-VT; renamed Waffen-SS) designed, tested, and issued its own distinctive patterns and layout not long after.

The United States Marine Corps received its first military camouflage pattern in 1942, when the reversible, beach-jungle, three- and five-color frog-skin pattern uniform was issued, based on a 1940 trial design. The pattern was mostly employed in the Pacific Theatre but was not found to be particularly effective and in the European Theatre the pattern was withdrawn altogether in 1944—in part because of anticipated friendly fire incidents after D-Day, due to its similarity to the Waffen SS's pattern (not to be confused with Flecktarn, a post-war design). Camouflaged helmet covers and shelters were issued in the 1950s in "wine leaf" and "brown cloud" patterns. The U.S. Army also tried a lesser-known camouflage uniform on D-Day and throughout the Normandy operations, like the Marine Corps uniforms, but it was replaced by the M43 uniform before being used much.

During the Vietnam War, the United States Armed Forces' four-color ERDL pattern saw limited use among specialist units in the U.S. Army, though most were issued the solid olive green OG107 sateens or jungle fatigues, while the Marines adopted the pattern service-wide after 1968.

The ERDL pattern fatigues were identical in cut to the third-pattern OD jungle fatigues, and were available in both a highland pattern (more brown) and a lowland pattern (more green), though the lowland pattern was eventually phased out. Other, unofficial, patterns utilized in Vietnam included black-dyed or spray-painted jungle fatigues, often used by special purpose forces, and various Vietnamese Tigerstripe patterns (themselves being based on French Army airborne and Foreign Legion patterns and a British design utilized in Malaysia), or commercial "duck hunter" patterns.

The general design and configuration of the U.S. BDU uniform were similar to that of the Vietnam War's jungle fatigues, which were in turn similar in configuration to specialty uniforms worn by U.S. paratroopers during World War II.

History

First issued in limited number to garrison leaders, officers, and generals to all branches of the U.S. Armed Forces in September 1981 for replacement of the long worn and aging Olive Drab colored uniforms or OG-107, the following month, the Battle Dress Uniform began field issue military-wide.

Since 1981, changes included the addition and subsequent elimination of buttoned waist adjustment tabs, the size reduction of the collar, and refinements in stitching and fit.

BDUs were initially only issued in a 50/50 nylon and cotton twill blend called the Temperate Weather BDU or TWBDU. Complaints regarding the heat retention of these uniforms, especially following the invasion of Grenada in 1983, led to the introduction of the Hot Weather BDU, the HWBDU. The Hot Weather BDU coat and trousers were constructed of 100 percent ripstop cotton, in a four-color woodland camouflage pattern. However, after complaints of shorter wear and frayed cuffs, along with requirements imposed by unit commanders to starch the all-cotton uniform for parade, the Enhanced Hot Weather BDU (EHWBDU) replaced the HWBDU commencing in 1996. The EHWBDU's components are made with a 50/50 ripstop nylon and cotton poplin blend.

BDUs were printed with infrared-brightened dyes. Near infrared (NIR) Signature Management Technology is used in the uniforms to help prevent detection by NIR Image Converters. These photocathode devices do not detect temperatures, but rather infrared radiation variances. NIR-compliant uniforms use a special fabric that allows soldiers to appear at the same radiation level as the surrounding terrain, thus making them more difficult to detect. It is advised not to use starch when cleaning or ironing BDUs since starch weakens the fabric and ruins the infrared protective coating. A pair of BDUs that has been starched even once should not be worn in combat.

The tropical weight uniform was not as durable as the temperate weight uniform.  The tropical uniform would only last for 4–6 months of use when rotating four uniforms for duty, while the temperate uniform would last over a year under the same conditions.

U.S. Army
All United States Army soldiers formally received their first batches of the BDU as its new field and garrison uniform in the temperate weight cut on October 1, 1981. In addition, Patrol caps, Boonie hats, and the M-65 jacket were issued in the new camouflage pattern in time, including a new light brown T-shirt and black webbed belt with brass buckle.

The BDU was the first camouflage uniform approved by the U.S. Army since the Vietnam War, where the ERDL pattern was in limited use. The BDU soon replaced all earlier camouflage pattern uniforms for all wooded, jungle, and tropical environments, and by 1989, had completely replaced the standard olive drab uniforms that had been used since 1952. April 30th 2008 was the final day that the BDU was authorized.

U.S. Department of Defense
The BDU was worn by DoD civilians and DoD Police officers.

U.S. Marine Corps
The ERDL-patterned BDU was first introduced to the United States Marine Corps in 1977, as they phased out the olive green OG-107, which had been standard wear since the early 1950s.

Originally, no nametapes were worn with the USMC's BDUs, which was officially referred to by the USMC as a "camouflage utility uniform" (CCU) during its usage. However, in October 1991, the USMC began the wearing of nametapes on their BDUs (and DCUs and DBDUs) in order to comply with NATO Standardization Agreement (STANAG), becoming mandatory by October 1992. In the USMC's case, a nametape bearing the wearer's last name was worn embroidered above the right pocket, and a nametape reading "U.S. MARINES" being embroidered was worn above the left pocket. The MCCUU which replaced the BDU continues this.

The USMC's BDU was worn with a stenciled iron-on Eagle, Globe, and Anchor (EGA) centered on the wearer's left breast pocket, below the pocket flap. Early USMC BDUs featured "USMC" lettering below that EGA, however, that was discontinued later on, with only the EGA being used by the end of the BDU's tenure with the USMC. The EGA was ironed onto the BDU blouse pocket by USMC recruits at the end of MCRD upon completion of their training to signify their christening as U.S. Marines. The same was done on the eight-pointed "utility cover" hat that was worn with the USMC's version of the BDU. The BDU's successor, the MCCUU, has the EGA embroidered instead of stenciled on the blouse's chest pocket and all covers.

U.S. Air Force
The U.S. Air Force initially only issued ERDL BDUs to combat arms units stationed overseas, such as United States Air Force Security Forces, Combat Controllers, and United States Air Force Pararescue, as of October 1981, the same time as the Army and Marines. The Air Force did not allow non-combat arms to wear the woodland pattern BDU until the summer of 1987 and mandated them as the only "Fatigue" uniform in 1988. The BDU was no longer authorized for wear in the USAF on November 1, 2011.

U.S. Navy
Sailors of the United States Navy started issuing the BDU in the new woodland scheme and temperate cut at the same time as the other branches. The U.S. Navy referred to the uniform as the "Camouflage Utility Uniform" (CUU) during its usage.

U.S. Coast Guard
Coast Guardsmen started issuing the new woodland BDU around the same time as the other service branches.

Successors 

The U.S. military has run trials of many camouflage patterns (some being used by foreign militaries), and issued environment-specific uniforms, notably the six-color Desert Battle Dress Uniform (DBDU),  nicknamed the "chocolate chip camouflage", designed in 1962, and the "nighttime desert grid" (NCDBDU). Both uniforms were used in 1991, during the Persian Gulf War. These Desert BDUs were discontinued after the war.

The Desert Camouflage Uniform (DCU) in three-color desert camouflage was introduced in 1992, and was utilized in operations in Somalia (1993); it was in service in Afghanistan and Iraq from the start of hostilities, but the U.S. Army and U.S. Marine Corps have both replaced the DCU with newer uniforms (ACU and MCCUU, respectively). In testing, U.S. Army researchers found that, as in other environments, the color of desert terrain varies, and can range from pink to blue, depending on the minerals in the soil and the time of the day. Since patches of uniform color in the desert are usually 10 times larger than those in wooded areas, it was decided to alter the existing six-color DBDU pattern. This led to the development of a three-color pattern DCU, which was adopted.

The BDU is made in various camouflage patterns by various manufacturers, such as in the MultiCam camouflage, which is in use today mainly by the public, public service persons, and some foreign military units. BDUs can be purchased from civilian vendors in the UCP pattern analogous to the ACU as well, but these are not authorized for wear by the U.S. Army's soldiers.

U.S. Marine Corps
The development of modern camouflage patterns and the rising desire of the various U.S. military branches to differentiate themselves from each other has resulted in new patterns for uniforms. The U.S. Marine Corps was the first branch to replace their BDUs. The Marine Corps Combat Utility Uniform (MCCUU) uses the computer-generated MARPAT pattern and several other enhancements. It was approved for wear in June 2001, became available for purchase in 2002, and the changeover was completed by October 1, 2004. Beyond that date, the BDU was authorized for wear until April 1, 2005, with limited exceptions for those small numbers of Marine Corps personnel who did not yet have the MCCUU. USMC Special Operations units (MARSOC) have recently issued M81 woodland-patterned uniforms to supplement MARPAT uniforms for special missions.

U.S. Army

In 2004, the U.S. Army unveiled the Army Combat Uniform (ACU), its successor to the BDU. From late 2005 to early 2008, the U.S. Army undertook the process of replacing the BDU with the ACU, with the BDU being formally discontinued by the Army in April 2008 (though most soldiers had been wearing the ACU for years by then). The Army Junior ROTC followed suit thereafter in 2009.

The original version of the ACU used a pixelated "digital" pattern known as the Universal Camouflage Pattern (UCP). UCP is similar to MARPAT but uses more neutral, less saturated colors. The neutral colors, primarily foliage green and sand yellow, are designed to work best in the desert, woodland, and urban combat situations. The ACU in UCP was used by the army in all environments except for areas with snow, as the UCP pattern works poorly against white despite the heavy use of grey. An all-white BDU and the ECWCS are used instead for winterized warfare. Beginning in 2014, the Army switched the ACU to use the Operational Camouflage Pattern (OCP), as UCP was seen as inadequate in many environments.

U.S. Department of Defense
Civilian employees of the U.S. Department of Defense in combat zones began wearing the Airman Battle Uniform and Army Combat Uniform in place of the BDU (and its cousin DCU) after it was replaced.

U.S. Navy
From 2004 to 2007, the U.S. Navy began issuing a pixelated blue and gray "digital" pattern Navy Working Uniform (NWU) in limited quantities to some sailors on an experimental test basis. While the NWU is neither a tactical uniform nor a battle dress uniform, it is intended to take the place of many existing work ensembles (utilities, wash khaki, coveralls, M81 BDU, etc.). The disruptive pattern is primarily intended to complement U.S. Navy ship colors and to hide stains and wear, and supposedly to make the wearer a less obvious visual target for hostile forces while working aboard a naval vessel in port.

To meet the Navy's cold-weather requirements, the NWU includes a fleece jacket, pullover sweater, and parka options. U.S. Navy SEALs, Seabees, and other U.S. Navy personnel deployed ashore under the cognizance of U.S. Naval Forces Central Command used "M81" woodland BDUs (referred to by the navy as CCUs) and DCUs for outdoor operations or activities in specific areas of responsibility (AOR), until the issuance of the NWU Type III in the AOR camouflage pattern.

U.S. Air Force
In 2004 and 2005, the U.S. Air Force experimented with but rejected a blue-toned tigerstripe uniform. In 2006, a new BDU-style uniform called the Airman Battle Uniform (ABU) was adopted, using a semi-pixelated tiger pattern with four soft earth tones consisting of tan, grey, green and blue. It failed, however, to incorporate many of the significant improvements of the ACU and MCCUU. By 2007, it was in current production.

In 2008, responding to criticism that the new Airman Battle Uniform was too heavy and hot in high-temperature environments, the USAF's 648th Aeronautical Systems Squadron at Brooks City-Base revealed plans to switch to a lighter, more breathable fabric for the combat blouse section of the ABU. The original heavyweight nylon-cotton blend was changed to a lighter-weight nylon-cotton poplin material. Priority will go to those serving in the Middle East or other hot-weather theaters.

On May 4, 2016, the National Commander of the Civil Air Patrol announced the USAF's approval for the Civil Air Patrol to begin its transition to the Airman Battle Uniform.

On May 14, 2018, the Air Force announced the adoption of the Army's Operational Camouflage Pattern uniform; however, its insignia would be distinct. The transition was to be complete by April 1, 2021.

U.S. Coast Guard
The U.S. Coast Guard has introduced the new Operational Dress Uniform (ODU) uniform in 2004 to replace the winter and summer "Undress Duty" uniform. Resembling the BDU, the ODU retains the basic design of the old-style BDU uniforms, but with the lower pockets on the blouse being eliminated. The sleeves can be worn "folded up" in a manner similar to the old U.S. Army and U.S. Air Force BDUs and the trousers "bloused" into the boots (unless boating shoes are worn, as is common for the U.S. Coast Guard Auxiliary, which patrols for the Coast Guard aboard privately owned watercraft), with the ODU black belt and blackened buckle being worn with the metal tip two to four inches from the buckle. The ODU is also issued in a single blue color as opposed to any camouflage pattern. The BDU and DCU were formally retired by the USCG in 2012.

The dark blue Coast Guard unit baseball-style cap is worn with this uniform. The ODU also has all of its allowable insignia sewn on, eliminating the chance of puncture wounds created by the pins if the individual suffers a blow to the chest while wearing a PFD or body armor. The ODU is not intended to be worn by Coast Guard units that engage in combat operations or are deployed overseas. These units continued to wear older woodland BDU and DCU uniforms before adopting the Navy Work Uniform for USCG units overseas or part of other DoD operations.

See also

Current
Marine Corps Combat Utility Uniform (MARPAT)
Navy Working Uniform
Operational Camouflage Pattern
Operational Dress Uniform
Airman Battle Uniform
Army Combat Uniform
MultiCam, also known as OCP or OEFCP (OEF Camouflage Pattern)

Former
Desert Battle Dress Uniform
Desert Camouflage Uniform
Desert Night Camouflage
United States Army uniforms in World War II
OG-107, the basic work utility uniform (fatigues) of all branches of the United States Armed Forces from 1952 until its discontinuation in 1989

References

External links 

Program Executive Office (PEO) Soldier
FAS page with descriptions and pictures of all BDU camouflage patterns

1981 in military history
United States military uniforms
History of fashion
Military equipment of the United States
United States Army uniforms
United States Air Force uniforms
Military equipment introduced in the 1980s